The  Washington Redskins season was the franchise's 58th season in the National Football League (NFL) and their 53rd in Washington, D.C. They improved on their 7–9 record from 1988 to 10–6 in 1989, finishing third in the NFC East. However, they failed to qualify for the playoffs for a second consecutive season.

Offseason

Roster

Regular season
In a week 14 victory against the San Diego Chargers, Joe Gibbs achieved career victory no. 100

Schedule

Note: Intra-division opponents are in bold text.

Standings

Awards and honors
Charles Mann, Pro Bowl selection

References

Washington
Washington Redskins seasons
1989 in sports in Maryland